The Florida Symphony Youth Orchestras (FSYO) is a music education program in Central Florida, consisting of six primary ensembles with nearly 300 student musicians.  FSYO is the oldest operating youth symphony in the state of Florida and is believed to be the 3rd oldest in the southeastern United States.  It was originally affiliated with the now-defunct Florida Symphony Orchestra.

Both new and returning student members are required to audition annually.  Acceptance and orchestra placement is a competitive, merit-based process in which auditionees must meet requirements for consideration. The organization is under the musical direction of Dr. James O. Welsch.

Early History 
In the early 1950s, Alphonse Carlo, who was both a Rollins College associate professor of music and the concertmaster of the newly-formed Florida Symphony Orchestra, recognized a need for a youth orchestra in Central Florida and worked for years to get one started.  Although FSYO officially celebrates its founding as the fall of 1957, evidence supports that the youth orchestra was started 4 years earlier.  In September 1953, Mr. Carlo convinced the Orange County School Board to partner with the professional Florida Symphony Orchestra to provide string lessons and a youth orchestra for the area students.  The program included a “school” which offered free lessons on Saturday mornings for 1st and 2nd year string players as well as a youth orchestra for “those students who were sufficiently advanced.”  The first classes/rehearsals were held at Howard Junior High School on November 7, 1953.

The supporting co-sponsors changed a couple of times over the first 5 years of the fledgling program.  The Orlando Sentinel stepped in as a financial partner in 1955  and was later replaced by Rollins College through its School for the Creative Arts in 1958.  The strings school component appears to have been dropped sometime during the 1959-60 season, leaving just the youth orchestra which eventually was renamed to the "Symphonic Orchestra."

In 1962, the program gained considerable structure and support under the full wing of the professional Florida Symphony Orchestra and its music director, Henry Mazer.  In 1980, FSYO became independent by incorporating as a non-profit and received its 501(c)(3) charitable tax status in 1982.  Despite its legal and financial independence in 1980, FSYO remained closely associated with the Florida Symphony Orchestra (FSO) until the professional orchestra ceased operations in 1993.

Decades of Support from FSO & Rollins College 
In 1962, the program gained considerable structure and support under the full wing of the professional Florida Symphony Orchestra and its music director, Henry Mazer.  Documents discovered in the Rollins College Dept. of Archives & Special Collections, show that while FSO provided the music staff and administration, the Rollins College School for Creative Arts provided the funding for the expenses of running the youth orchestra, including paying for conductor salaries, music, rent, janitorial, etc.  Receipts and archive concert programs show that this arrangement continued for approximately 20 years from the late 1950s until the late 1970s.

Name Changes 
As evidenced from various old newspaper articles and archived concert programs, the youth orchestra changed its name 9 times since inception.  All but one of the changes took place in the program's first 23 years.  The earliest formation of the youth orchestra in 1953 was named the “Florida Symphony Student Orchestra.”  But by 1956, it was being called the “Florida Youth Symphony.”  Today’s familiar name of the “Florida Symphony Youth Orchestra” came about In 1958.  However, it didn't last for long.

In 1962, Florida Symphony Orchestra's new music director, Henry Mazer, fully adopted the struggling youth program and had it rebranded as the “Florida Symphony Youth Training Orchestra,”  and then later shortened it to the “Florida Symphony Training Orchestra.”  After Mazer left in the spring of 1966, the name was changed back to the “Florida Symphony Youth Orchestra” for a brief time.  Next came new FSO music director, Herman Hertz in 1967, who promptly changed the name to the “Florida Youth Symphony”  and then later changed it again to “Florida Youth Orchestra.”  In 1976, the name was changed back to the original, “Florida Symphony Youth Orchestra” and it remained so for 41 years.   

In 2017, FSYO's Board of Directors voted to slightly change the name by replacing "Orchestra" with the plural, "Orchestras," to better reflect the current size & breadth of the entire program.

Ensembles 
 Symphonic Orchestra - A full orchestra for advanced students (ages 13–20) of difficult orchestral literature (started 1953).
 Philharmonia Orchestra - A full orchestra created for intermediate to advanced students (ages 11–18) of orchestral literature (began 1981).
 Prelude Orchestra - A full orchestra for intermediate students (ages 9–15) of orchestral literature.
 Overture Stings - A beginning to intermediate experience for strings only (ages 7–14).
 Chamber Orchestra - Supplemental ensemble for advanced students seeking performance experience with literature written for chamber ensembles.  Must already be a student of the Symphonic Orchestra.
 Jazz Orchestra I - This 18-21 piece ensemble of advanced students (ages 13–20) focuses on the study of big band jazz music, the theory behind jazz composition and improvisation.
 Jazz Orchestra II - A 17-20 piece ensemble of intermediate-level students (ages 12–18) that focuses on the study of big band jazz music.
 Stringmania Summer Camp - 2-week summer camp for beginning to intermediate strings held each July.

Summer tours 
 2021 - Miami
 2019 - China
 2018 - New York City - Carnegie Hall
 2017 - Munich, Vienna, Salzburg, Prague
 2004 - Washington, DC
 2001 - Munich, Interlaken, Prague, Zurich
 1999 - Munich, Salzburg, Vienna
 1997 - Australia - Sydney Opera House
 1995 - Great Britain
 1993 - Basel, Switzerland and Barcelona, Spain
 1991 - Boston - Symphony Hall
 1989 - New York City - Carnegie Hall
 1985 - New Orleans - New Orleans World's Fair

Music Directors

References

External links
FSYO Home Page

Youth organizations based in Florida
American youth orchestras
Musical groups established in 1957
1957 establishments in Florida
Orchestras based in Florida
Music of Orlando, Florida
American jazz ensembles from Florida